Nengone is a language of the Loyalty Islands, New Caledonia.

Phonology
The phonological inventory of consonants is untypically large for an Oceanic language. Many sounds which are allophones in other sub-families are distinct phonemes in the Nengone language:

Phonemes in parentheses only occur in words borrowed from other languages.

Bibliography
Tryon, D.T. and Dubois, M.J. Nengone dictionary. Part I: Nengone-English. C-9, viii + 452 pages. Pacific Linguistics, The Australian National University, 1969. 
Tryon, D.T. and Dubois, M.J. Nengone dictionary. Part II: English-Nengone. C-23, iv + 205 pages. Pacific Linguistics, The Australian National University, 1971.

References

Loyalty Islands languages
Languages of New Caledonia